The Duquesne Brewing Company was a major brewery in Pittsburgh, Pennsylvania, from its founding in 1899 until its dissolution in 1972. The brand was revived under the name Duquesne Brewing Company in 2008, in order to re-establish the beer in Western Pennsylvania starting in the summer of 2010.

History

Founding

The Duquesne Brewing Company was officially incorporated on April 4, 1899. The first president was Henry Miller, formerly a furniture salesman. The original trademark of the brand was a depiction of Fort Duquesne (though it actually featured a depiction of the Fort Pitt Blockhouse with the words "Fort Duquesne" underneath it), and the more recognizable "Prince of Pilseners" trademark was added later.

The brewery decided to use refrigerated train cars to ship the beer, an innovative move in the early twentieth century. A Chicago stockyard man, Max Epstein, connected Duquesne with Armour and Company, and had Duquesne's company logo emblazoned on one of the cars. At first sight, the Duquesne reps thought the car was a giant billboard for their company and purchased twenty cars. The money that Epstein netted from the sale enabled him to found the General American Transportation Corporation.

Even before Prohibition, Pittsburgh's brewing operations had begun to combine into fewer players, with most ending up under either the umbrella of the Pittsburgh Brewing Company or the Independent Brewing Company of Pittsburgh. Duquesne was among fifteen joining the latter in 1905.

Prohibition

Starting in 1920, Prohibition forced many breweries, distillers, and taverns to close. Duquesne was one of only 725 American breweries left when the movement was repealed in April 1933. In 1937, the company renamed itself as the Duquesne Brewing Company of Pittsburgh. The company, reformed under their original charter, emerged as the largest brewing company in Pennsylvania at a yearly production rate of 325,000 barrels.

Expansion

Duquesne's production capacity increased to two million barrels after World War II when a new building opened at the South Side site in 1950, making it one of the top ten breweries in the United States. The company's best known brand was "Duke," and its popular advertising slogan was "Have a Duke!"

The company had plants in Carnegie (Plant 3) and McKees Rocks (Plant 2), in addition to the South Side flagship brewery, although those soon closed after the new brew house opened at Plant 1 in 1950 (Plant 3 closed in 1952, and Plant 2 in 1950). The curved profile of the 1950 building at Plant 1 was to accommodate the PRR Whitehall Branch, which serviced the brewery from sidings along and off Mary Street.

In January 1963, Duquesne expanded into the Cleveland market by purchasing the rights to P.O.C. Beer from the Pilsener Brewing Company after they closed their plant.

Dissolution

While the company had been profitable through the 1950s, profits had declined by 1962 to $211,586 and the trend showed no sign of abating. A proposed 1965 acquisition by Pittsburgh Brewing ran afoul of anti-trust laws, and was enjoined in United States v. Pittsburgh Brewing Co. and Milton G. Hulme. The Friday family, longtime stewards of the brand, would lose control to investor Raymond Sigesmund in a stock battle in 1966. Sigesmund brought in his son-in-law, Franklyn D. Jeans, to run the brewery, but the problems continued. Jeans fired Lando, Inc., the company which had replaced long-time agency Vic Maitland in 1965 on the Duquesne Brewing advertising account, and replaced them with his own company, Admark.

Sales at Duquesne Beer had fallen to $13 million by 1971. The company, due to competition from national brands sold its labels to C. Schmidt & Sons Brewing Company of Philadelphia in late 1972, and closed the flagship plant. Schmidt brewed Duquesne in Cleveland into the 1980s, but sales fell drastically after Allegheny County commissioner Thomas Foerster called for a boycott of out-of-town beers; by the very end of the beer's production, the packaging was even changed to look like Schmidt's.

Revival
In June 2010, Pittsburgh-area attorney Mark J. Dudash announced plans to resurrect the Duquesne Beer brand, to be brewed by City Brewing Company at the Latrobe, PA.  Dudash and his wife, Maria, incorporated Duquesne Brewing Company in late 2008 as a formal start to the project and also re-registered the brand's trademark, which had expired.

Beers

The Duquesne Brewery's brands included Silver Top Lager, Silver Top Ale, Duke Ale, Duquesne Pilsener, Duquesne Bavarian Beer, Duquesne Bock Beer, Duquesne Heavy-Dry Beer, Duquesne Draft Beer, Duquesne Porter, Old Nut Brown Ale, Frontenac Pale Ale, Duquesne Beer, Carnegie Beer and Duquesne Buccaneer Beer.

The revived Duquesne Brewing Company currently brews its flagship Duquesne Pilsener, Duquesne LT, a light beer, and Fort Pitt, an ale.

In 2015 Duquesne introduced the Paterno Legacy Series to commemorate late football coach Joe Paterno. The brewery reported the commemorative cans sold quickly.

Duquesne Brewery building

The 1899 Duquesne Brewery brewhouse building, located at Mary Street and 21st Street in the South Side Flats neighborhood, now is home to the Brew House Association, which provides housing, studio space, and a gallery for Pittsburgh artists. The adjacent 1950 brewhouse building has been partially restored but is currently vacant. The cellar and keg department is now a self storage facility. A storage and garage building has become living space. The former office building has become Beitler-McKee Optical. The bottling works has become U.S. Cargo. Raff Printing and Rynn's Luggage occupy the case storage and shipping buildings. The bridge between the bottling works and case storage stands, while the bridge connecting the two brewhouses has been dismantled.

The surviving historic elements of the company complex were listed on the National Register of Historic Places in 2015.

Duquesne Brewery clock

The Duquesne Brewery is distinguishable from other buildings on Pittsburgh's South Side by its large clock, visible from throughout the city.

References

External links
 News articles
 
 
 
 
 

Beer brewing companies based in Pittsburgh
Industrial buildings and structures in Pittsburgh
Clock towers in Pennsylvania
Industrial buildings and structures on the National Register of Historic Places in Pennsylvania
National Register of Historic Places in Pittsburgh
American companies established in 1899
Food and drink companies established in 1899
Food and drink companies disestablished in 1972
1899 establishments in Pennsylvania
1972 disestablishments in Pennsylvania
Re-established companies
Food and drink companies established in 2008
2008 establishments in Pennsylvania
American companies disestablished in 1972